The geology of Artsakh is primarily part of the Kussary-Divichi Foredeep—the northern foredeep of the Greater Caucasus. The trough is filled with Oligocene to Quaternary age deepwater, molasse and marine sedimentary rocks.

References

Geology
Artsakh
Artsakh
Geology of Asia by country
Geology of Europe by country
Geology by country